Bohumil Kosour (5 March 1913 – 24 April 1997) was a Czechoslovak soldier and skier.

Kosour was born in Radňovice. He was a member of the national Olympic military patrol team in 1936 which placed eighth. He also took part at the 18 km cross-country ski and the Nordic combined event of the 1948 Winter Olympics. In a row from 1939 to 1942 and in 1949 he placed first at the Zlatá lyže (Golden Ski) cross-country ski race in his hometown, which was primarily carried out for the first time in 1934.

External links 
 Bohumil Kosour at Sports Reference

References 

1913 births
1997 deaths
People from Žďár nad Sázavou District
People from the Margraviate of Moravia
Czechoslovak military patrol (sport) runners
Czechoslovak male cross-country skiers
Czechoslovak male Nordic combined skiers
Military patrol competitors at the 1936 Winter Olympics
Nordic combined skiers at the 1948 Winter Olympics
Cross-country skiers at the 1948 Winter Olympics
Olympic biathletes of Czechoslovakia
Olympic cross-country skiers of Czechoslovakia
Olympic Nordic combined skiers of Czechoslovakia
Sportspeople from the Vysočina Region